"Everyday Girl" is a song by German girl group Preluders. It was written by Fredrik Björk and Per Eklund and produced by Jörn-Uwe Fahrenkrog-Petersen and Gena Wernik for their debut studio album, Girls in the House (2003). The song was released as the album's lead single on 17 November 2003 and reached number one on the German Singles Chart while peaking within the top five in Austria and Switzerland.

Track listing

Credits and personnel

 Miriam Cani – vocals
 Anh-Thu Doan – vocals
 Jörn-Uwe Fahrenkrog-Petersen – production, mixing
 Manfred Faust – additional mixing
 Artemis Gounaki – vocal arrangement
 Nik Hafemann – supervising producer

 Rebecca Miro – vocals
 Anne Ross – vocals
 Patricia Sadowski – vocals
 Jörg Sander – guitar
 Felix Schönewald – vocal recording
 Gena Wernik – production, mixing

Charts

Weekly charts

Year-end charts

Certifications

References

2003 singles
2003 songs
Number-one singles in Germany
Preluders songs
Polydor Records singles